The Trollhättan Water Tower is a landmark in central Trollhättan in Västergötland, Sweden. It is located next to Drottningtorget ("the Queen's Square") and University College West. The tower was built in 1909 by architect Erik Josephsson at the same year as Olidan Power Station. In 1992 it was converted to a tower of apartments. In total the tower consists of nine one- or two-storey apartments.

Notes

See also
 Water tower

Water towers in Sweden
Towers completed in 1909
Listed buildings in Sweden
Infrastructure completed in 1909
Trollhättan Municipality